Ebor Falls is a tiered waterfall on the Guy Fawkes River, located near Ebor and about  north-east of Wollomombi on Waterfall Way in the New England region of New South Wales, Australia.

Location and features

This viewing platform shows the upper falls tumbling  over 4 layers of columned basalt rock in two falls. The lower Ebor falls,  further on, plunge over Permian sedimentary rocks into a steep forested gorge below.

The falls are a well known tourist attraction within Guy Fawkes River National Park, with viewing platforms of the falls and walking tracks, a rest area with barbecues, an information display, picnic tables and toilet. In 2008 the waterfalls were attracting up to 80,000 visitors each year. Camping is not permitted at Ebor Falls, however camping is available at nearby Cathedral Rock National Park.

The falls were first protected in a recreation reserve in 1895. In September 2008 new lookout platforms were opened. These replaced platforms that were destroyed by fire in 2007.

History
Ebor Falls began to form around 19 million years ago with lava flows from the nearby extinct Ebor Volcano.

The traditional owners of Ebor Falls are the Gumbaynggirr people, who call the falls Martiam, an Aboriginal expression meaning "the great falls".

See also

List of waterfalls of Australia

References

External links

Waterfalls of New South Wales
New England (New South Wales)
Waterfalls of the Waterfall Way
Tiered waterfalls